This is a list of state parks and state natural areas in Texas, United States, managed by the Texas Parks and Wildlife Department.  Several state historic sites that used to be managed by Texas Parks and Wildlife are now managed by the Texas Historical Commission.

State parks

A 

Abilene State Park
 Albert and Bessie Kronkosky State Natural Area - under development
Atlanta State Park

B 

Balmorhea State Park
Barton Warnock Visitor Center
Bastrop State Park
Battleship TEXAS State Historic Site
Bentsen-Rio Grande Valley State Park
Big Bend Ranch State Park
Big Spring State Park
Blanco State Park
Bonham State Park
Brazos Bend State Park
Buescher State Park

C 

Caddo Lake State Park
Caprock Canyons State Park and Trailway
Cedar Hill State Park - includes Penn Farm Agricultural History Center
Chinati Mountains State Natural Area - not open to the public
Choke Canyon State Park - includes Calliham Unit and South Shore Unit
Cleburne State Park
Colorado Bend State Park
Cooper Lake State Park - includes Doctors Creek Unit and South Sulphur Unit
Copper Breaks State Park

D 

Daingerfield State Park
 Davis Hill State Park - not open to the public
Davis Mountains State Park
Devil's Sinkhole State Natural Area - access by reservation only
Devils River State Natural Area - includes Dan Allen Hughes Unit and Del Norte Unit
Dinosaur Valley State Park

E 

Eisenhower State Park
Enchanted Rock State Natural Area
Estero Llano Grande State Park

F 

Fairfield Lake State Park
Falcon State Park
Fort Boggy State Park
Fort Leaton State Historic Site
Fort Parker State Park
Fort Richardson State Park, Historic Site, and Lost Creek Reservoir State Trailway
Franklin Mountains State Park

G 

Galveston Island State Park
Garner State Park
Goliad State Park and Historic Site - includes Mission Rosario State Historic Site and Zaragoza Birthplace State Historic Site
Goose Island State Park
Government Canyon State Natural Area
Guadalupe River State Park

H 

Hill Country State Natural Area
Honey Creek State Natural Area
Hueco Tanks State Park and Historic Site
Huntsville State Park

I 

Inks Lake State Park

J

K 

Kickapoo Cavern State Park

L 

Lake Arrowhead State Park
Lake Bob Sandlin State Park
Lake Brownwood State Park
Lake Casa Blanca International State Park
Lake Colorado City State Park
Lake Corpus Christi State Park
Lake Livingston State Park
Lake Mineral Wells State Park & Trailway
Lake Somerville State Park and Trailway - includes Birch Creek Unit and Nails Creek Unit
Lake Tawakoni State Park
Lake Whitney State Park
Lockhart State Park
Longhorn Cavern State Park
Lost Maples State Natural Area
Lyndon B. Johnson State Park and Historic Site - includes Sauer-Beckmann Living History Farm

M 

Martin Creek Lake State Park
Martin Dies, Jr. State Park
McKinney Falls State Park
Meridian State Park
Mission Tejas State Park
Monahans Sandhills State Park
Mother Neff State Park
Mustang Island State Park

N

O 

Old Tunnel State Park

P 

Palmetto State Park
Palo Duro Canyon State Park
Palo Pinto Mountains State Park - under development
Pedernales Falls State Park
Possum Kingdom State Park
 Powderhorn Ranch - not open to the public
Purtis Creek State Park

Q

R 

Ray Roberts Lake State Park - includes Isle du Bois Unit, Johnson Branch Unit, Jordan Park Unit, Ray Roberts Greenbelt Corridor, and Sanger Marina Unit
Resaca de la Palma State Park

S 

San Angelo State Park
Sea Rim State Park
Seminole Canyon State Park and Historic Site
Sheldon Lake State Park and Environmental Learning Center
South Llano River State Park
Stephen F. Austin State Park

T 

Tyler State Park

U

V 

Village Creek State Park

W 

Wyler Aerial Tramway

X

Y

Z

See also 
Texas Parks and Wildlife Department
List of Texas state historic sites
List of U.S. national parks
List of former Texas state parks

External links 
Texas Parks & Wildlife Department - Texas State Park List and Map
List of All Parks & Recreation Areas in Texas
Parks Under the Lone Star, an online exhibit by the Texas Archive of the Moving Image, includes archival film and video footage of more than 50 Texas parks.

 
Texas state parks
State parks